The Stinkers Bad Movie Awards (formerly known as the Hastings Bad Cinema Society) was a Los Angeles-based group of film buffs and film critics devoted to honoring the worst films of the year.

The society was founded by Mike Lancaster and Ray Wright, two former ushers who met in the late 1970s at what is now the Pacific Hastings Theater in Pasadena, California (from which the society originally got its name).

History

Founding 
Lancaster and Wright offered the annual Stinkers Bad Movie Awards, which was a parody of the Academy Awards. The Stinkers were similar to the Golden Raspberry Awards (the "Razzies"), which debuted four years after the Stinkers. Aside from the usual categories one might expect in an Oscar parody (Worst Picture, Worst Actor, etc.), the Stinkers offered other categories such as Worst Fake Accent, Most Painfully Unfunny Comedy, Least 'Special' Special Effects and Worst On-Screen Hairstyle. Unlike the Razzies, the Stinkers did not have an awards ceremony.

The Stinkers' first ballots 

The Stinkers' first ballots were handed out to the public in 1997. In the years that followed, the Razzies and Stinkers rarely agreed on a list of nominees or winners. The Stinkers initially opened their balloting to the general moviegoing public but soon discovered that most people surveyed hadn't seen many of the films on the ballot and often just voted for the person they hated the most, usually someone like Mariah Carey, the Spice Girls or anyone connected with the film Gigli.

In 2001 the Stinkers created 100 Years, 100 Stinkers: The Worst Films of the 20th Century, a list that parodied AFI's 100 Years...100 Movies list. The next year the Stinkers made a special trophy of a miniature flushing toilet for comedian actor Tom Green. Green's Freddy Got Fingered was nominated for seven awards and won Worst Film, Worst Sense of Direction, Worst Actor and Most Painfully Unfunny Comedy. That same year the Stinkers gave a special award to David Manning, the controversial Sony Pictures fictitious movie critic. 
The Stinkers included in 2003 another special category for Worst Performance by a Child, dedicated to child actor Spencer Breslin.

In 2004, the Stinkers went to a more selective way of obtaining votes. They dismantled their membership and offered ballots by invitation only to a small, select group of film geeks and critics, who had seen a majority of the films during the year.

Nominating Paris Hilton 
In 2006, the Stinkers refused to nominate hotel heiress Paris Hilton for her supporting role in the horror film House of Wax. Said Lancaster, "To get on the Stinkers ballot you are judged on your performance, not your tabloid persona. Anyone that would put Paris Hilton on a list of the five worst supporting actresses in 2005 didn't see a lot of movies in 2005. I could list twelve actresses who gave worse supporting performances than Paris Hilton."

The next year, the Stinkers did nominate Hilton for Worst Actress for her performance in the barely released National Lampoon's Pledge This!.

Closure 
In late January 2007, following the announcement of the year's winners, the Stinkers website announced it would be officially closed down after ten years on the internet. On July 1, 2007, four months after the announcement of the worst of 2006 winners, the site was taken down.

Award categories

Motion picture 
 Worst Picture: 1978 to 2006
 Worst Performance by an Actor in a Lead Role: 1978 to 1981, 1993 to 2006
 Worst Performance by an Actress in a Lead Role: 1978 to 1981, 1993 to 2006
 Worst Performance by an Actor in a Supporting Role: 1978 to 1981, 1996 to 2006
 Worst Performance by an Actress in a Supporting Role: 1978 to 1981, 1996 to 2006
 Worst Sense of Direction: 1978 to 1981, 1997 to 2006
 Worst Screenplay/Worst Screenplay for a Film Grossing Over $100 Million Worldwide: 1978 to 1981, 1996 to 2006
 Most Painfully Unfunny Comedy: 1978 to 1981, 1995 to 2006
 Worst On-Screen Couple: 1978 to 1981, 1997 to 2006
 Worst On-Screen Group: 1978 to 1979, 2000 to 2003
 Worst On-Screen Hairstyle: 1981, 1996, 1998 to 2001, 2006
 Most Annoying Fake Accent: 1978 to 1981, 1997 to 2000, 2006
 Worst Performance by a Child in a Featured Role: 1980 to 1981, 1999, 2003 to 2006
 Worst Sequel: 1978 to 1981, 1993 to 2006
 The Sequel Nobody Was Clamoring For: 1993 to 2000
 Worst Remake: 1980 to 1981, 1999 to 2000, 2002, 2005 to 2006
 Worst Resurrection of a TV Show: 1993 to 1994, 1996 to 2000, 2002 to 2005
 Worst Song in a Motion Picture: 1978 to 1981, 1998 to 2006
 Most Intrusive Musical Score: 1980 to 1981, 1999 to 2006
 Least "Special" Special Effects: 1979 to 1981, 1999 to 2000, 2003 to 2006
 Most Unwelcome Direct-to-Video Release: 1997 to 2001
 Worst Achievement in Animation/Worst Animated Film: 1999 to 2000, 2005 to 2006
 Most Overrated Film: 2003, 2005 to 2006

Special awards 
Special categories have also been introduced for specific years. Some have been in multiple ballots while others were used one time.

Recurring special awards 

Founders Award – What Were They Thinking and Why?
1993: Short Cuts
1994: I'll Do Anything and Prêt-à-Porter
1995: Johnny Mnemonic
1996: The Phantom and The Stupids
1997: Cats Don't Dance, Crash, Jungle 2 Jungle, and Year of the Horse
1998: The Academy of Motion Pictures Arts and Sciences, for giving the Lifetime Achievement Award to Elia Kazan; the Motion Picture Association of America for rating Babe: Pig in the City G and Orgazmo NC-17; and Universal Pictures for its shot-for-shot remake of Psycho
1999: The Motion Picture Association of America for rating Eyes Wide Shut R.

Founders Award
2000: Motion Picture Association of America for rating Scary Movie R.
2001: David Manning, Sony Pictures' fictitious movie critic.

The Spencer Breslin Award (Worst Performance by a Child Actor)
2003: Spencer Breslin (The Cat in the Hat)
Other nominations: Dakota Fanning (The Cat in the Hat and Uptown Girls), Lydia Jordan (Gods and Generals), Frankie Muniz (Agent Cody Banks), and Daryl Sabara (Spy Kids 3-D: Game Over)
2004: Soren Fulton (Thunderbirds)
2005: Adrian Alonso (The Legend of Zorro)
Other nominations: Jake Church (Brokeback Mountain), Jacob Davich (The Adventures of Sharkboy and Lavagirl in 3-D), Aaron Michael Drozin (Fun with Dick and Jane), and Max Thieriot (The Pacifier)
2006: Spencer Breslin (The Santa Clause 3: The Escape Clause, The Shaggy Dog, and Zoom)
Other nominations: Tristan Lake Leabu (Superman Returns), Grayson Russell (Talladega Nights: The Ballad of Ricky Bobby), Dominique Saldana (Unaccompanied Minors), and Houston Tumlin (Talladega Nights: The Ballad of Ricky Bobby)

One-off Special Awards

Ceremonies

1978
1979
1980
1981
1982
1983
1984
1985
1986
1987
1988
1989
1990
1991
1992
1993
1994
1995
1996
1997
1998
1999
2000
2001
2002
2003
2004
2005
2006

See also

 Academy Awards
 The Golden Turkey Awards
 Golden Raspberry Awards
 List of films considered the worst
 Box-office bomb

References

External links

Stinker Awards page on the Internet Movie Database
 Stinkers Bad Movie Awards (1978–2004) The Envelope on The Los Angeles Times
 Stinkers Bad Movie Awards (2006) Thestinkers.com

 
Ironic and humorous awards
American film awards
Awards established in 1978
Awards disestablished in 2007
Internet properties established in 1997
Internet properties disestablished in 2007
Lists of worsts
1978 establishments in California
2007 disestablishments in California